The Other Side of the Sun is a compilation of eight short children's stories written by Evelyn Sharp.

Contents
The short stories in this book are:
The Weird Witch of the Willow-Herb
The Magician's Tea-Party
The Hundredth Princess
Somebody Else's Prince
The Tears of Princess Prunella
The Palace on the Floor
The Lady Daffodilia
The Kite That Went to the Moon

References

1900 short story collections
British short story collections
Children's short story collections
1900 children's books
British children's books